Boophis madagascariensis is a species of frog in the family Mantellidae. It is endemic to Madagascar.
Its natural habitats are subtropical or tropical moist lowland forests, subtropical or tropical moist montane forests, rivers, freshwater marshes, intermittent freshwater marshes, and heavily degraded former forest.
It is threatened by habitat loss.

References

madagascariensis
Endemic frogs of Madagascar
Amphibians described in 1874
Taxa named by Wilhelm Peters
Taxonomy articles created by Polbot